Inferior iliac spine may refer to:

 Anterior inferior iliac spine
 Posterior inferior iliac spine